The Gold Cup is a defunct cup competition which involved competitors from Ireland and from 1921 onwards, just for Northern Ireland. It was initially run by the New Irish Football Association but later, and mainly, by the Irish Football Association.

The competition was first played in the 1911–12 season after seven of the eight participating clubs left the IFA (only Linfield remained) after a dispute over money and founded the New IFA. This new organisation introduced the cup as the "New Irish Cup". At the end of the season after many discussions, the dissident clubs returned to the IFA and the tournament was not held in 1912-13. However, it was revived by the IFA in 1913–14 season. In the seasons 1915–16 to 1918–19 season it was played in a league format. This involved a play-off between the two teams topping the table in the first of these seasons. The competition was last staged in 2000-01.

Last year of competition
The last season that the Gold Cup was competed for was during the 2000-01 season. Glentoran were the victors after defeating Coleraine in the final. It was Glentoran's third Gold Cup victory in as many seasons.

Format
The format for the Gold Cup varied throughout its history, but most commonly it was organised on a knock-out basis.

The format over the years was as follows:

In 1915–16, there was a play-off between the top two teams.

Sponsorship
From the late 1970s on the Gold Cup was sponsored by Hennessy, TNT (1984/85-1994/95), Sun Life (1995/96-1996/97) and Nationwide (1997/98-2000/01).

List of Gold Cup finals

Key:

Performance by club

Substitute Gold Cup
Between the 1940/41 and 1946/47 seasons the Gold Cup was competed for by the Northern Regional League Clubs and known as the "Substitute Gold Cup".

Performance by club

References

External links
Gold Cup Archive at the Irish Football Club Project
Irish League Archive - Gold Cup

Defunct association football cup competitions in Northern Ireland
Defunct all-Ireland association football cup competitions
Former All-Ireland association football competitions